Dolichoderus primitivus is an extinct species of Miocene ant in the genus Dolichoderus. The fossils were found in the Dominican Amber, and was described by Wilson in 1985.

References

†
Fossil taxa described in 1985
Miocene insects
†
Fossil ant taxa